Avon is a village in Fulton County, Illinois, United States. The population was 799 at the 2010 census, down from 915 at the 2000 census.

Geography
Avon is located in northwestern Fulton County at  (40.662254, -90.435485). A small portion of the village extends west into Warren County. Illinois Route 41 passes through the village, leading north  to Galesburg and southwest  to Bushnell.

Climate

History
Ira Woods and his family settled in Avon in 1835. Avon was named "Woodsville" from 1837 to 1843. In 1843, the town became big enough to ask for a post office. The name was then changed to "Woodstock". On April 4, 1852, the United States Postmaster General gave the town the name of "Avon" to avoid confusion with another community in McHenry County, IL. Avon was once a thriving town, due in part to the railroad industry, by serving as a method of transporting cattle to the slaughterhouses in Chicago and also as a stop between Chicago and Quincy.

Demographics

As of the census of 2000, there were 915 people, 375 households, and 260 families residing in the village. The racial makeup of the village was 98.80% White, 0.11% Native American, 0.11% Asian, 0.66% from other races, and 0.33% from two or more races. Hispanic or Latino of any race were 0.77% of the population.

There were 375 households, out of which 29.1% had children under the age of 18 living with them, 52.3% were married couples living together, 12.5% had a female householder with no husband present, and 30.4% were non-families. 26.7% of all households were made up of individuals, and 15.2% had someone living alone who was 65 years of age or older.  The average household size was 2.44 and the average family size was 2.93.

In the village, the population was spread out, with 24.0% under the age of 18, 8.3% from 18 to 24, 25.0% from 25 to 44, 21.9% from 45 to 64, and 20.8% who were 65 years of age or older.  The median age was 40 years. For every 100 females, there were 93.9 males.  For every 100 females age 18 and over, there were 86.3 males.

The median income for a household in the village was $33,417, and the median income for a family was $38,819. Males had a median income of $30,167 versus $21,429 for females. The per capita income for the village was $16,257.  About 9.9% of families and 11.7% of the population were below the poverty line, including 16.7% of those under age 18 and 10.8% of those age 65 or over.

Notable people

 Ken Carpenter, radio and TV announcer

References

Villages in Fulton County, Illinois
Villages in Warren County, Illinois
Villages in Illinois
Populated places established in 1837
1837 establishments in Illinois